Daniel Guillermo Porozo Valencia (born September 20, 1997) is an Ecuadorian professional footballer who currently plays for Libertad F.C..

References

1997 births
Living people
Ecuadorian footballers
Ecuadorian expatriate footballers
Expatriate footballers in Mexico
Association football forwards